The Luck of the Irish is a 1948 American comedy film directed by Henry Koster, and starring Tyrone Power and Anne Baxter. The film was based on the 1948 novel There Was a Little Man by Guy Pearce Jones and Constance Bridges Jones.

Plot
Stephen Fitzgerald, a newspaper reporter from New York, meets a leprechaun and beautiful young Nora, while traveling in Ireland. When he returns to his fiancée Frances, and her wealthy father David C. Augur in the midst of a political campaign in New York, he finds that the leprechaun and the young woman are now in the big city as well. Stephen is torn between the wealth he might enjoy in New York or returning to his roots in Ireland.

Cast

Awards and nominations
 Best Supporting Actor (nomination) - Cecil Kellaway

Radio adaptation 
The Luck of the Irish was presented on Lux Radio Theatre on CBS December 27, 1948. The adaptation starred Dana Andrews, Baxter, Kellaway, and Stanley Holloway.

References

External links

 

1948 films
1940s fantasy comedy films
American fantasy comedy films
Leprechaun films
Films about Irish-American culture
Films directed by Henry Koster
Films with screenplays by Philip Dunne
Films scored by Cyril J. Mockridge
Films set in Ireland
Films set in New York City
20th Century Fox films
1948 comedy films
Films based on American novels
1940s American films
1940s English-language films